The 2015 budget of Ukraine is the national budget for fiscal year 2015, which runs from January 1, 2015 to December 31, 2015. The budget takes the form of a budget bill which must be agreed by Verkhovna Rada in order to become final, but never receives the signature or veto of the President of Ukraine. Actual government spending will occur through later appropriations legislation that is signed into law.

Overview
Ukraine's parliament approves austerity laws needed for the draft budget on the early morning of 29 December 2014. "This budget, like other budgets adopted in this hall, is far from perfect," Yatsenyuk said before the vote. "That’s why the budget must be reviewed no later than February 2015". The Rada was under pressure to approve a budget as soon as possible before the new financial year. Ukraine was seeking to unlock the next tranche of a $17 billion bailout loan from the IMF.

Total revenues and spending
These tables are in billions of hryvnias. The draft budget for 2015.

Receipts

Outlays by agency

External links

Ukraine budgets
Budget
Ukrainian budget
budget